Churia may be:
 Churia River in Georgia
 Churia Tunnel
 Churia Hills or the Churia Range (aka Sivalik Hills)